Lavu Nageswara Rao is a former Judge of Supreme Court of India. He is the 7th person elevated directly from the bar to the Supreme Court and was sworn in on 13 May 2016. He was a Senior advocate and a former Additional Solicitor General of India.

Early life
He hails from Pedanandipadu in Guntur district of Andhra Pradesh. He was educated at Loyola Public School, Guntur, JKC College, Guntur and at TJPS College, Guntur.

Career
He practiced in Andhra Pradesh High Court before shifting his practice to the Supreme Court of India. He was designated as a Senior Advocate in 2000. He was one of the most highly paid lawyers in the country.

He appeared in Karnataka High Court for J. Jayalalitha in the Disproportionate assets case and was successful in reversing the trial court Judgement and getting her acquitted. One of the last cases he argued before the Supreme Court of India was NEET case in which he appeared for State of Tamil Nadu and Christian Medical College.

He was elevated as Judge of Supreme Court of India on 13 May 2016.

He retired on 7 June 2022.

Law Officer
He served as an Additional Solicitor General of India thrice. Firstly under NDA government from August 8, 2003 till his resignation in 2004. UPA Government appointed him as A.S.G. in August 2013 and he resigned in May 2014. His third stint as A.S.G. was from June 7 to December 15, 2014 under the present Government.

Commission of Inquiry
He was also a member of the Supreme Court-appointed Mudgal Committee headed by Justice Mukul Mudgal and comprising senior advocate and former cricket umpire Nilay Dutta as the other member. The committee is tasked with conducting an independent inquiry into allegations of corruption, betting and spot-fixing in Indian Premier League  matches.

References 

Living people
Solicitors General of India
Justices of the Supreme Court of India
21st-century Indian judges
1957 births
People from Guntur district